Zainal Abidin Hassan bin Ali (born 9 November 1961) is a Malaysian former footballer and the former head coach of Malaysia Super League side Penang.

Playing career
A versatile footballer who can playing in multiple positions, Zainal Abidin is well known as the best Malaysian footballer in the 80's and 90's. His football career started with Selangor FA in 1980. At the age of 18 years 6 month, Zainal made his international debut in the 1980 Merdeka Tournament against Indonesia. He played along with Malaysian legendary striker the late Mokhtar Dahari, R Arumugam, Soh Chin Aun and other recognised faces in Malaysian football.

In 1987, he partnered Dollah Salleh in front as they became the fierce striker for Selangor FA and Pahang FA in Malaysia Cup and also the national team in SEA Games, Asian Games and Merdeka Tournament. In 1996 AFF Championship, Zainal Abidin was awarded as the MVP of the tournament. Three years later he was awarded the AFC Century Club Award.

During his international career, Zainal scored a total of 78 goals in 180 appearances for Malaysia (including non-FIFA 'A' international matches), according to Globe Soccer Awards in 2020. Against other nations' national 'A' teams, he scored 50 goals in 129 appearances.

He also played for Malaysia national futsal team, and was in the squad that took part in the 1996 FIFA Futsal World Championship in Spain.

On 3 August 2021, he was inducted into the FIFA Century Club.

Coaching career
He retired from football in 1999 and selected to coach the Malaysian youth in 2001. In 2002, he selected as the assistant coach for Malaysia senior team. He later coached Pahang FA and brought them their first Malaysia Super League title. In 2006, he guided Pahang FA to win the Malaysian FA Cup.
After the contract with Pahang FA ended, he reunites with his former striker partner Dollah Salleh. This time they act as manager-coach combination for Shahzan Muda FC.

In 2011, he returns to Pahang FA as assistant manager, where he works again with Dollah, who were the current head coach. The partnership lasts until the end of 2013, when they helped Pahang win the 2013 Malaysia Cup; Pahang's first Malaysia Cup after 21 years. After Dollah left Pahang to coach PDRM FA and Ron Smith was appointed as the new Pahang head coach at the end of 2013, Zainal was appointed as his assistant head coach. But after Smith's contract was not renewed in March 2014, Zainal Abidin was appointed as Smith's replacement. With Pahang, he won the Malaysia Cup in 2014 and also Malaysia FA Cup in the same year.

In 2016, Zainal Abidin made his return to Selangor as head coach, replacing Mehmet Durakovic. This was not without controversy, as negotiations between Zainal and Selangor was made public when Durakovic was still Selangor coach, and Durakovic contract was terminated even after he won the 33rd Malaysia Cup title with Selangor in 2015. Zainal however was sacked in August the same year, after poor performances by the team in the Super League and Malaysia Cup.

Zainal Abidin next coached Penang FA from May 2017 until September 2018. In November 2018, he was unveiled as the new head coach of Melaka United. After two years with Melaka, he returned back to coach Penang again for a short period of time in 2022 season.

Personal life
Zainal Abidin's father is of Kenyan descent. His oldest brother Khalid Ali and  oldest son Mohd Zaiza is also a Malaysian footballer.

Zainal has been married to Zalina Binti Zaini since 1985 and they have five children. In 2023, he marriage to his second wife's, Malaysian singer Fyna Jebat.

Career statistics

International goals
List of international goals scored by Zainal Abidn Hassan. Scores and results list Malaysia's goal tally first.

International goals by date, venue, opponent, score, result and competition.

Honours

As a Player

Selangor FA
Malaysia Super League
1989, 1990

Malaysia Premier League
Runner-up: 1999

Malaysia Cup
1981, 1982, 1986, 1997
Runner-up: 1980

Malaysia FA Cup
1991, 1997
Runner-up: 1990

Malaysia President Cup (as Selangor Youth Team)
1988
Runner-up: 1987, 1999

Malaysia Charity Shield
1985, 1987, 1990, 1997
Runner-up: 1998

Pahang FA
Malaysia Super League
1992, 1995

Malaysia Cup
1983, 1992

Malaysia Charity Shield
1992, 1993

Malaysia

Pestabola Merdeka
1986

SEA Games
1989

Individual
AFC Asian All Stars
1982, 1985
Malaysian League Golden Boot
1983, 1986, 1989, 1992

AFF Championship Most Valuable Player 
1996

AFC Century Club Awards
1999

As a Head Coach

Pahang FA
Malaysia FA Cup
2006, 2014
Malaysia Cup
2014

Malaysia Charity Shield
2014

Selangor FA
Malaysia Charity Shield
Runner-up: 2016

Individual
FAM Football Awards – Best Coach Award
2014

Filmography

Film

Television series

See also
List of men's footballers with 100 or more international caps
List of men's footballers with 50 or more international goals

References

External links
 Zainal Abidin Hassan at selangorfc.com 

Living people
Malaysian footballers
Malaysia international footballers
1961 births
Selangor FA players
Sri Pahang FC players
People from Selangor
Malaysian people of Kenyan descent
Malaysian people of Malay descent
Southeast Asian Games silver medalists for Malaysia
Southeast Asian Games bronze medalists for Malaysia
Southeast Asian Games gold medalists for Malaysia
Southeast Asian Games medalists in football
Association football defenders
Association football forwards
Competitors at the 1987 Southeast Asian Games
FIFA Century Club